The November 2012 nor'easter was a powerful nor'easter that brought significant early season snow to the Northeastern United States. Many of the areas hit by the storm had been affected by Hurricane Sandy days before, which further complicated recovery efforts.

Meteorological history
A mid-level shortwave over the Midwestern United States was moving eastward on November 6, just four days after Hurricane Sandy dissipated, toward a trough over the Southeastern United States, and into an area with abundant moisture and favorable conditions from the jet stream. The combination was favorable for a nor'easter to form, and on November 7, a strong low pressure area developed along the coast of North Carolina. At the time, there was an area of cold air inland the Mid-Atlantic States and New England that would allow the precipitation to fall as snow. Its large circulation dropped rain and snow across the northeastern United States.
Some areas within NYC, got close to a foot of snow across Western Long Island, including Eastern Queens County in a narrow snow band that set up because of the coastal front.

Preparation and Impact
Immediately after Hurricane Sandy made landfall, forecasters were already discussing the possibility of a nor'easter directly impacting New Jersey during the following week. In preparation for the storm, coastal areas of New Jersey, New York, and Connecticut were advised to evacuate, with parts of Islip, New York, were under a mandatory evacuation. Before the nor'easter struck, officials recommended residents in low-lying areas of New York City to evacuate, A portion of the Long Island Expressway was closed during the storm, and the Long Island Rail Road shut down. Airlines canceled over 1,300 flights in or out of New York airports. Parks in New York City were closed, and construction was halted. In Nassau County, New York, more than 140 trucks put sand and salt on roads. Schools were closed in Connecticut. Due to sufficiently cool air and steady snowfall, the National Weather Service issued a winter storm warning. The New York Red Bulls had to postpone a Major League Soccer tournament game due to the snow.

Across New Jersey and New York, the storm dropped rain and snow in areas that sustained significant damage from Hurricane Sandy about ten days prior. High winds downed trees that were weakened by Sandy, some of which fell onto power lines. About 50,000 people lost power in the two states who had previously lost power after the hurricane. Along the coast, the storm produced  waves, and coastal roads were flooded. There were two traffic deaths in Connecticut that were related to the storm.

On November 8 as of 9 a.m. EST, around 715,000 eastern U.S. homes and businesses were without power. This is an increase of nearly 43,000 from 12 hours earlier, due to the effects of the storm. There were 167,000 power outages in New Jersey alone, and at least 50,000 on Long Island.

At 6 a.m. EST on November 9, about 265,000 New Jersey homes and businesses were without power because of Sandy and the nor'easter.

Name

The Weather Channel dubbed this storm as "Winter Storm Athena," but this name was rejected by the National Weather Service. In response to the naming system, the National Weather Service announced on November 7, 2012, that it would not recognize the Weather Channel's names for winter storms, stating in a press release that "it does not use the name of winter storms in its products."

See also

Hurricane Sandy
February 2013 nor'easter
March 2013 nor'easter

References 

2012 disasters in Canada
2012 natural disasters in the United States
Nor'easters
November 2012 events in North America
2012 in Connecticut
Natural disasters in Connecticut
2012 in Nova Scotia